Herman Sokol (October 14, 1916 – June 22, 1985) was an American chemist who was a co-discoverer of tetracycline. He was president of Bristol-Myers Company from 1976 to 1981.

Biography
He was born on October 14, 1916. He was president of the Bristol-Myers Company from 1976 to 1981. He died on June 22, 1985, at the Memorial Sloan-Kettering Cancer Center in Manhattan, New York.

Legacy
Montclair State University established Margaret and Herman Sokol Institute for Pharmaceutical Life Sciences.

References 

1916 births
1985 deaths
20th-century American chemists
Bristol Myers Squibb people